Duck Down Music Inc is a New York City based record label, talent management, music-marketing, and consulting company founded by Drew "Dru-Ha" Friedman and Kenyatta "Buckshot" Blake in 1995. In Duck Down's 20-year existence, the Company has released over 40 albums and sold more than 3 million collective copies worldwide. Home of established hip hop artists such as Boot Camp Clik, Pharoahe Monch, Black Rob, 9th Wonder, KRS-One, B-Real of Cypress Hill, The Away Team, Statik Selektah, Random Axe, Promise, David Dallas, Marco Polo, Ruste Juxx, Torae, Blue Scholars, Special Teamz (Slaine of La Coka Nostra, Ed O.G., Jaysaun, DJ Jayceeoh) and Kidz in the Hall.

History
Duck Down (whose name derived from Boogie Down Productions' 1992 hit single of the same name) was originally established as a management company in 1994 to manage the careers of Buckshot's group Black Moon and Smif-N-Wessun.  In 1995, co-owners Drew "Dru Ha" Friedman and Kenyatta "Buckshot" Blake launched Duck Down Music.  After successful debut releases from Black Moon (Enta da Stage) and Smif-N-Wessun (Dah Shinin'), Duck Down entered into a label distribution deal with Priority Records, at the time EMI's top hip hop label, which was home of N.W.A and Master P's No Limit Records.  Within the first year of the deal, Dru Ha & Buckshot introduced its two newest acts simultaneously: Heltah Skeltah and O.G.C. merging the two groups, forming a quintet, which they dubbed the Fab Five.  At Priority/EMI, Duck Down eventually brought over the rest of its core roster, which consisted of the Boot Camp Clik, members: Black Moon, Smif-N-Wessun, Heltah Skeltah, and O.G.C..  They released nine albums with Priority Records between 1995–2000.

In 2002, Duck Down entered a new physical distribution partnership with Navarre Corporation for their CD and DVD products in the U.S. and Canada. Duck Down retained its Digital Distribution rights and has its own direct deal with iTunes.  Duck Down produces, manufactures and markets its products independently.

In 2005, Duck Down released Monkey Barz (Sean Price's solo debut), Chemistry (a collaborative album between Buckshot & producer 9th Wonder) and Smif 'n' Wessun: Reloaded.  Collectively, the three albums cover Artwork was created by clothing designer Marc Ecko and marketed under the campaign: "Triple Threat".

In 2007, Duck Down switched distribution to Koch Records (now E1 Music) and began expanding its roster as they released albums from Special Teamz's 2007 Stereotypez, Kidz in the Hall's 2008 The In Crowd and 2010 Land of Make Believe, as well as Cypress Hill's front man B-Real's 2009 solo LP Smoke N Mirrors  and KRS-One & Buckshot's 2009 Survival Skills - represented a few examples of albums showing the labels growing diversity.

In 2011, in addition to releasing Pharoahe Monch's W.A.R. (We Are Renegades) album, Duck Down Music formed 3D, a music-marketing and consulting firm with its own distribution network that's experienced in navigating the indie landscape.  Executing a strategy where 3D provides General Management for Artist-owned indie sub-labels such as Talib Kweli's Javotti Media (Gutter Rainbows)  and Blue Scholars.  This allowed artists to tap into 3D's expertise, relationships, and networks, while retaining control of their projects and ownerships of their masters.  Expanded services from 3D are a Music Supervision Department that places clients songs in film, TV, and video games and creation and sales of Artist Merchandising.

2012, saw the releases of Sean Price’s highly anticipated Mic Tyson album, Skyzoo’s A Dream Deferred,’ 9th Wonder & Buckshot's 3rd collaborative album and releases from acts Murs & Fashawn and De La Soul’s Plug 1 & Plug 2. 2012 also saw the launch of Duck Down Visuals, a production division dedicated to documenting various artists and the lifestyle of their music through self-produced visual shorts. This included several viral Sean Price skits, profiles on up and coming acts; Freddie Gibbs, Ab-Soul etc., and special series like Verse Unheard.

In 2013, Duck Down Music was retained as project management for Talib Kweli's latest album, Prisoner of Conscious, distributed by EMI Label Services. Overseeing album deliverables, allocation of budget, co-op approvals, international distribution & overall marketing.  Duck Down Music's 3D Division was also retained to consult for Cinematic Music Group assisting with Joey Bada$$ project management services with their distributor RED Distribution.

Music licensing
As of 2011, Duck Down has placed its artists' songs and original compositions on several notable TV shows (ESPN's Men's College Basketball programming, ESPN's SportsCenter, HBO's Hard Knocks & Entourage, MTV's Jersey Shore & Station Zero, CSI, The History Channel's Gangland, VH1's Basketball Wives, and more).

Other promotions include video Game placements (Activision's Call of Duty: Modern Warfare 2, Tony Hawk: Ride, Madden NFL 09, NBA 2K11, Rockstar Games' Midnight Club: Los Angeles  and more), movie placement (Limitless), and national brand campaigns (Smirnoff, Belvédère).

Notable marketing campaigns
Duck Down's artists have previously aligned with several notable brands for their lifestyle and grassroots marketing campaigns such as Scion, 
Rockstar Games, Coca-Cola, Microsoft Zune, Pepsi Max, VTech, Reebok, and more.

In 2010 and 2011, Duck Down partnered with 2K Sports to present a unique opportunity for aspiring producers and MCs.  This involved an open call for submissions for original sample-free compositions for a chance to receive placement in the NBA 2K's game soundtrack (NBA 2K11 and NBA 2K12) and a trip to NYC to perform at Duck Down's CMJ Showcase.

For NBA 2K12, the winners were the music producer/composer Alex Kresovich for his instrumental "The Return" (Ithaca, NY) and the rap group D.J.I.G. (Glassboro, New Jersey) for their song "Now's My Time" recorded over Alex's instrumental. Alex Kresovich's instrumental "The Return" was also used for the music in the debut commercial for NBA 2K12 which aired on May 31, 2011 during Game 1 of the NBA Finals between the Miami Heat and Dallas Mavericks.

 Boot Camp Clik (Buckshot, Smif-N-Wessun, Heltah Skeltah, O.G.C.)
 B-Real
 Black Moon
 Black Rob
 Blue Scholars
 Bodega Bamz
 9th Wonder
 Chelsea Reject
 Dope D.O.D. (Skits Vicious (MC), Dopey Rotten (MC), Jay Reaper (MC), Dr. Diggles (DJ), Peter Songolo (Record producer))
 Kidz in the Hall
 KRS-One
 Marco Polo
 Pharoahe Monch
 Representativz
 Statik Selektah
 Team Facelift
 The Away Team
 De La Soul's Plug 1 & Plug 2 Present First Serve

Discography

1996
 Heltah Skeltah - Nocturnal
 O.G.C. - Da Storm
1997
 Boot Camp Clik - For the People
1998
 Cocoa Brovaz - The Rude Awakening
 Heltah Skeltah - Magnum Force
1999
 Black Moon - War Zone
 O.G.C. - The M-Pire Shrikez Back
 Various Artists - Duck Down Presents: The Album
 Buckshot-  The BDI Thug
 Representativz - Angels of Death
2000
 Boot Camp Clik - Basic Training: Boot Camp Clik's Greatest Hits
2002
 Boot Camp Clik - The Chosen Few
 Various Artists - Collect Dis Edition
2003
 Buckshot - The BDI Thug (expanded re-released version)
 Black Moon - Total Eclipse
2005
 Sean Price-  Monkey Barz
 Buckshot & 9th Wonder - Chemistry
 Smif-N-Wessun - Smif 'N' Wessun: Reloaded
 Black Moon - War Zone Revisited (expanded re-released version)
2006
 Boot Camp Clik - The Last Stand
2007
 Sean Price - Jesus Price Supastar
 Boot Camp Clik - Still For the People (For the People re-release)
 Boot Camp Clik -Casualties of War
 Special Teamz - Stereotypez
 Smif-N-Wessun - Smif-n-Wessun: The Album
2008
 Buckshot & 9th Wonder - The Formula
 Kidz in the Hall - The In Crowd
 Heltah Skeltah - D.I.R.T.
 DJ Revolution - Kings of the Decks
 Ruste Juxx - Indestructible
2009
 B-Real -Smoke N Mirrors
 Torae & Marco Polo - Double Barrel
 Steele of Smif-N-Wessun - Welcome to Bucktown
 Blue Scholars - OOF! EP
 Blue Scholars - Bayani Redux
 KRS-One & Buckshot - Survival Skills (album)
 Skyzoo - The Salvation
2010 
 Steele of Smif-N-Wessun - AmeriKKKa's Nightmire Part 2: Children of War
 Kidz in the Hall - Land of Make Believe
 Marco Polo & Ruste Juxx - The eXXecution
 Marco Polo - The Stupendous Adventures of Marco Polo
 Various Artists - 15 Years Of Duck Down
 Skyzoo & Illmind - Live from the Tape Deck
2011
 Promise - Awakening
 Pharoahe Monch - W.A.R. (We Are Renegades)
 Random Axe (Sean Price, Guilty Simpson, and Black Milk) - Random Axe
 Pete Rock & Smif-N-Wessun - Monumental
 Black Rob - Game Tested, Streets Approved
 The Away Team - Scars & Stripes
 David Dallas - The Rose Tint
 Statik Selektah - Population Control
 Kidz in the Hall - Occasion

2012
 De La Soul's Plug 1 & Plug 2 - First Serve
 Ruste Juxx & The Arcitype - V.I.C. (Victorious Impervious Champions)
 Murs & Fashawn - This Generation
 Skyzoo - A Dream Deferred
 Sean Price - Mic Tyson
 Buckshot & 9th Wonder - The Solution

2013
 P-Money - Gratitude
 Statik Selektah - Extended Play
 Smif-N-Wessun - Born and Raised
 Dope D.O.D. - Da Roach

2014
 Buckshot & P-Money - Backpack Travels
 Statik Selektah - What Goes Around...

2015
 Bodega Bamz - Sidewalk Exec
 Chelsea Reject - CMPLX
 Statik Selektah - Lucky 7

2020
 Ruste Juxx & Amadeus360theBeatKing - James Brown of the Underground

Mix CDs
2002: Boot Camp Clik & DJ Peter Parker Search And Recover Part 1
2004: Smif-N-Wessun & DJ Revolution Still Shinin
2004: Sean Price Donkey Sean Jr
2004: Boot Camp Clik & DJ Evil Dee Search And Recover Part 2
2005: DJ Bucktown Blastin' Off Vol. 1
2005: Boot Camp Clik & DJ Tony Touch Best of BCC Freestyles
2005: DJ Logic (DJ Master Nash) Rap Center
2006: Black Moon - Alter the Chemistry
2006: Smif-N-Wessun X-Files Official Mix
2006: Boot Camp Clik & DJ Sherazta Search And Recover Part 3
2006: Steele America Nightmare
2006: Tek Famlee First Mix CD - Vol. 1
2006: Tek I Got This
2006: DJ Bucktown Blastin' Off Vol.2
2007: Steele Hotstyle Takeover
2007: Sean Price Master P
2007: Ruste Juxx Reign of Destruction
2007: Supreme The Perfect Weapon
2008: Rock Shell Shock
2008: Duck Down Hotline
2008: Ruste Juxx The Prelude Mixtape
2009: Naledge of Kidz in the Hall Chicago Picasso
2009: Steele Welcome To Bucktown
2009: Sean Price Kimbo Price
2010: Tek 24KT Smoke
2010: Rock Rockin Out West
2010: Ruste Juxx Adamantine
2011: David Dallas The Rose Tint
2011: SkyzooThe Great Debater
2011: The Best of Duck Down Music 2011
2012: Skyzoo Theo Vs. J.J."
2020: Ruste Juxx & Amadeus360TheBeatKing James Brown of the Underground''

References

External links
 Duck Down Website
 Duck Down YouTube
 Duck Down SoundCloud

Hip hop record labels
American independent record labels
Record labels established in 1995
Hardcore hip hop record labels